Kim Hong-kyun (born 30 April 1989) is a South Korean rower. He competed in the men's lightweight double sculls event at the 2008 Summer Olympics.

References

1989 births
Living people
South Korean male rowers
Olympic rowers of South Korea
Rowers at the 2008 Summer Olympics
Place of birth missing (living people)
Rowers at the 2010 Asian Games
Asian Games competitors for South Korea